There are three bridges carrying Hopyard Road (part of unsigned State Road 434) over several brooks within Devil's Hopyard State Park in the U.S. state of Connecticut. The main route of SSR 434 follows the Eightmile River and the bridges cross over its minor tributaries. All three bridges are listed on the National Register of Historic Places (as Bridge No. 1603, Bridge No. 1604, and Bridge No. 1605, corresponding to their structure numbers in the National Bridge Inventory). They are good examples of vernacular rustic park architecture.

History
The state of Connecticut, in developing Devil's Hopyard State Park in the 1920s, contemplated the construction of SSR 434, but funding of those types of capital projects was suspended in 1930. Funding from the federal Works Progress Administration jobs program was then applied to the project, resulting in the completion of the bridges by the end of 1937. The roadway itself was not completed until several years later. All three bridges were rehabilitated in 1988, capping the arch with concrete and a waterproof membrane before restoring the roadbed.

Bridge data

See also

National Register of Historic Places listings in Middlesex County, Connecticut
List of bridges on the National Register of Historic Places in Connecticut

References

External links
Picture of Bridge 1604 at Connecticut History Online

Road bridges on the National Register of Historic Places in Connecticut
Bridges completed in 1937
East Haddam, Connecticut
Works Progress Administration in Connecticut
Civilian Conservation Corps in Connecticut
Bridges in Middlesex County, Connecticut
National Register of Historic Places in Middlesex County, Connecticut
1937 establishments in Connecticut
Stone arch bridges in the United States